David Córcoles Alcaraz (born 8 May 1985) is a Spanish professional footballer who plays for CF Vilamarxant as a right back.

Club career
Born in Alicante, Valencian Community, Córcoles started his professional career with hometown club Hércules CF, finishing his football grooming at local giants Valencia CF. On 5 December 2006 he played his first game with the first team of the latter, coming on as a substitute for Miguel Pallardó in the last minute of the 0–1 group stage loss against A.S. Roma for the UEFA Champions League; in La Liga's last round, also in that season, he featured the full 90 minutes of a 3–3 home draw to Real Sociedad.

Córcoles moved to FC Barcelona B in the summer of 2007, never receiving an opportunity with the main squad. In July 2009 he signed a two-year contract with Recreativo de Huelva, recently relegated to the second division.

References

External links

1985 births
Living people
Footballers from Alicante
Spanish footballers
Association football defenders
La Liga players
Segunda División players
Segunda División B players
Tercera División players
Hércules CF players
Valencia CF Mestalla footballers
Valencia CF players
FC Barcelona Atlètic players
Recreativo de Huelva players
Albacete Balompié players
Racing de Santander players
CD Alcoyano footballers
Spain youth international footballers